MC4J is an open source project to create a visual management application for Java servers supporting the JMX specification. It supports connections to all major J2EE application servers and JSE 5.0 and greater.
The MC4J features shown as follows: 
Can connect to ten different server types from a single interface
Multiple live connections to any combination of the supported servers
Full MBean tree to view all the exposed information in a server
View server configurations and statistics remotely
Perform operations on a server
Register and track notifications
Monitor performance information from the JVM itself using JDK 5
Dynamic charting for all numeric information
Custom dashboards for specific features in a server
Query the server to find specific MBeans by name or by their attributes

See also
 
MX4J

External links 
 Sourceforge site

Java enterprise platform